José Manuel Díaz Gallego (born 18 January 1995 in Jaén) is a Spanish cyclist, who currently rides for UCI ProTeam .

After  lost its UCI license and its riders lost their contracts on 1 March 2022, Díaz was left without a job. On 3 June 2022  announced they had signed him on a 2-year contract.

Major results
2017
 10th Gran Premio di Lugano
 10th Pro Ötztaler 5500
2019
 1st  Mountains classification, Czech Cycling Tour
2020
 1st Stage 8 Tour du Rwanda
2021
 1st  Overall Tour of Turkey
1st Stage 5
 9th Overall Tour du Limousin
 10th Overall Tour de l'Ain
2022
 6th Overall Troféu Joaquim Agostinho
  Combativity award Stage 9 Vuelta a España

Grand Tour general classification results timeline

References

External links

1995 births
Living people
Spanish male cyclists
Sportspeople from Jaén, Spain
Cyclists from Andalusia
20th-century Spanish people
21st-century Spanish people